Sportsbet is an online gambling company owned by Flutter Entertainment, primarily targeting the Australian market. Sportsbet is licensed as a corporate bookmaker in the Northern Territory under the Racing and Betting Act 1993 (NT). Sportsbet offers betting services online through its website and its mobile app (on IOS and Android) as well as by telephone and has more than 1.25 million Australian customers as at the end of 2019.

Sportsbet is headquartered in Melbourne and operates within the strict boundaries set by multiple Australian regulatory authorities at a federal and state level. This regulation involves varying restrictions on products and promotional activities that can be offered by licensed corporate bookmakers in Australia.

The company was acquired by Paddy Power in December 2010, and since 2 February 2016, it has been owned by Flutter Entertainment.

History
The business name Sportsbet Australia was first registered in 1994, with domain name registered in 1999.

In May 2009, 51% was acquired by Paddy Power, who continued brand name and company operation as a separate entity, while offering additional services. The takeover allowed to acquire rival betting company International All Sports Limited, for 27.2 million euros.

In March 2011, Paddy Power took full ownership of Sportsbet.

Paddy Power and British rival Betfair agreed terms for a merger on 8 September 2015. The business is owned 52% by the former Paddy Power shareholders and 48% by the former Betfair shareholders. The merger was completed on 2 February 2016. On 5 April 2016, it was announced that 650 jobs in United Kingdom and Ireland would be lost at the company.

On 6 March 2019, Paddy Power Bet Fair announced that it would rebrand as Flutter Entertainment, pending shareholder approval at the company's annual general meeting in May. Flutter was originally the name of a betting exchange acquired by Betfair in December 2001. The company stated that the rebrand, which took place on 28 May 2019, would not affect the company's individual customer facing gaming brands.

In May 2020, the global merger between Flutter Entertainment and The Stars Group was finalized following regulatory and shareholder approvals. Sportsbet and BetEasy formed the Australian component of the merger. Incumbent CEO of Sportsbet Barni Evans was appointed to lead the combined Sportsbet and BetEasy businesses, with a decision made to move forward with the sole Sportsbet brand, retiring the BetEasy brand following a period of migration and integration.

In November 2021, Sportsbet lost more than $50 million due the oddsmakers mistake.

References

Online gambling companies of Australia
Companies based in Melbourne
Australian companies established in 1993
Gambling companies established in 1993
2010 mergers and acquisitions
Companies based in Darwin, Northern Territory